Karimganj  is a city in the Karimganj District of the Indian state of Assam. It is the administrative headquarters of the district.

The area of Karimganj city is 16.09 km2. It has an average elevation of 13 metres (42 feet).

Demographics 
As per as the official census of 2011, Karimganj city had a population of 56,854 of which 28,473 are males while 28,381 are females. Children in the age group of 0 to 6 years were 4,946. Karimganj had a literacy rate of 86.35%, out of which male literacy was 87.91% and female literacy was 84.78%. The sex ratio is 996. There were 12,234 households as of 2011.

Religion

Most of the people in the town follow Hinduism, with significant followers of Islam and a small Christian and Jain population.

Politics
Karimganj consists of five assembly constituencies: Karimganj North and Karimganj South, Badarpur, Patharkandi, and Ratabari; all of which are part of Karimganj (Lok Sabha constituency).

Notable people

Dwarka Nath Das, former MP of Karimganj (1991-1998)
Kripanath Mallah, current MP of Karimganj
Bijoy Malakar, current MLA of Ratabari LAC, Karimganj

See also
 Government Boys' HS School Ground, the town's cricket ground
 Karimganj (Lok Sabha constituency)

References

External links
 Karimganj news

 
Cities and towns in Karimganj district